Otopappus is a genus of flowering plants in the tribe Heliantheae within the family Asteraceae, primarily Mesoamerican but with one species from Jamaica.

 Species
 Otopappus acuminatus S.Watson - Jalisco
 Otopappus brevipes B.L.Rob. - from Chiapas to Nicaragua
 Otopappus calarcanus S.Díaz -  Colombia
 Otopappus curviflorus (R.Br.) Hemsl. - from Veracruz to Nicaragua
 Otopappus epaleaceus Hemsl. - from Puebla to Guatemala
 Otopappus glabratus (J.M.Coult.) S.F.Blake - Guatemala, Honduras, El Salvador
 Otopappus guatemalensis (Urb.) R.L.Hartm. & Stuessy  - Guatemala, Belize, Yucatán
 Otopappus hirsutus (Sw.) R.L.Hartm. & Stuessy - Jamaica
 Otopappus imbricatus (Sch.Bip.) S.F.Blake - Puebla, Morelos, Michoacán, Guerrero
 Otopappus koelzii McVaugh - Michoacán, Colima, Jalisco
 Otopappus mexicanus (Rzed.) H.Rob. - Guerrero, Oaxaca
 Otopappus microcephalus S.F.Blake - Colima, Jalisco, Guerrero, Oaxaca
 Otopappus robustus Hemsl. - Veracruz
 Otopappus scaber S.F.Blake - Guatemala, Belize, Yucatán, Chiapas
 Otopappus syncephalus Donn.Sm. - Guatemala
 Otopappus tequilanus (A.Gray) B.L.Rob. - Sinaloa, Jalisco, Nayarit, Michoacán, Guerrero, Oaxaca
 Otopappus verbesinoides Benth. - from Oaxaca to Nicaragua
 formerly included
Several species one included in Otopappus are now regarded as better suited to other genera: Lundellianthus Oblivia Verbesina

References

Heliantheae
Asteraceae genera
Flora of Central America
Flora of Mexico
Taxa named by George Bentham